This is a list of dioceses, deaneries and parishes of Church of Sweden January 1, 2013. There were then 13 dioceses, 130 deaneries and 1,426 parishes.

The dioceses, deaneries and parishes are ordered after diocese code, deanery code and parish code.

Note: this list only contains parishes of the Church of Sweden.

Diocese of Uppsala 

Deanery of Uppsala
Uppsala cathedral parish
Helga Trefaldighet parish
Vaksala parish
Danmark-Funbo parish
Gamla Uppsala parish
Gottsunda parish
Deanery of Oland and Frösåker
Frösåker parish
Alunda parish
Öregrund-Gräsö parish
Hökhuvud parish
Ekeby parish
Skäfthammar parish
Dannemorabygden parish
Rasbo parish
Rasbokil parish
Tuna parish
Stavby parish
Deanery of Eastern Uppland
Rimbo parish
Husby, Skederid and Rö parish
Fasterna parish
Närtuna parish
Gottröra parish
Rådmansö parish
Frötuna parish
Norrtälje-Malsta parish
Länna parish
Blidö parish
Riala parish
Roslagsbro-Vätö parish
Almunge parish
Knutby-Bladåker parish
Faringe parish
Häverö-Edebo-Singö parish
Väddö parish
Björkö-Arholma parish
Estuna and Söderby-Karl parish
Lohärad parish
Edsbro-Ununge parish
Deanery of Enköping
Veckholm parish
Boglösa parish
Villberga parish
Enköping parish
Tillinge and Södra Åsunda parish
Sparrsätra-Bred parish
Fjärdhundra parish
Lagunda parish
Deanery of Sigtuna
Husby-Ärlinghundra parish
Norrsunda parish
Skepptuna parish
Valsta parish
Sigtuna parish
Knivsta parish
Alsike parish
Lagga parish
Östuna parish
Vassunda parish
Husby-Långhundra parish
Övergran parish
Kalmar-Yttergran parish
Skokloster parish
Häggeby parish
Kungsängen-Västra Ryd parish
Bro parish
Deanery of Western Uppland
Bälingebygden parish
Norra Hagunda parish
Tensta parish
Lena parish
Ärentuna parish
Björklinge parish
Skuttunge parish
Viksta parish
Balingsta parish
Hagby parish
Ramsta parish
Uppsala-Nä parish
Västeråker parish
Dalby parish
Vittinge parish
Västerlövsta parish
Enåker parish
Huddunge parish
Östervåla parish
Harbo parish
Nora parish
Deanery of Örbyhus
Tierp-Söderfors parish
Hållnäs-Österlövsta parish
Älvkarleby-Skutskär parish
Västland parish
Tolfta parish
Vendel parish
Tegelsmora parish
Deanery of Gästrikland
Gävle Heliga Trefaldighet parish
Gävle Staffan parish
Valbo parish
Hille parish
Hedesunda parish
Hamrånge parish
Gävle Maria parish
Bomhus parish
Ockelbo parish
Torsåker parish
Hofors parish
Ovansjö parish
Järbo parish
Årsunda-Österfärnebo parish
Sandviken parish
Deanery of Southern Hälsingland
Söderala parish
Ljusne parish
Mo-Bergvik parish
Skog parish
Söderhamn parish
Sandarne parish
Norrala-Trönö parish
Bollnä parish
Rengsjö parish
Arbrå-Undersvik parish
Alfta-Ovanåker parish
Hanebo-Segersta parish
Deanery of Northern Hälsingland
Järvsö parish
Ljusdal-Ramsjö parish
Färila-Kårböle parish
Los-Hamra parish
Hudiksvall-Idenor parish
Delsbo parish
Forsa-Hög parish
Enånger-Njutånger parish
Hälsingtuna-Rogsta parish
Bjuråker-Norrbo parish
Harmånger-Jättendal parish
Gnarp parish
Bergsjö parish
Ilsbo parish
Hassela parish

Diocese of Linköping 

Cathedral deanery
Linköping cathedral parish
Gottfridsberg parish
Linköping Saint Lawrence parish
Linköping Johannelund parish
Linköping Skäggetorp parish
Linköping Ryd parish
Linköping Berga parish
Landeryd parish
Deanery of Motala and Bergslag
Motala parish
Aska parish
Vadstena parish
Dal parish
Fornåsa parish
Borensberg parish
Klockrike parish
Tjällmo parish
Finspång parish
Västra Ny parish
Godegård parish
Deanery of Folkungabygden
Skänninge parish
Boxholm parish
Ödeshög parish
Veta parish
Viby parish
Västra Harg parish
Östra Tollstad parish
Mjölby parish
Väderstad parish
Deanery of Norrköping
Norrköping Saint Olof parish
Norrköping Saint John parish
Kolmården parish
Norrköping Borg parish
Deanery of Söderköping
Östra Husby parish
Jonsberg parish
Västra Vikbolandet parish
Söderköping Saint Anna parish
Valdemarsvik parish
Ringarum parish
Östra Ryd parish
Åtvid parish
Deanery of Tjust
Västervik parish
Hjorted parish
Hallingeberg-Blackstad parish
Gladhammar-Västrum parish
Törnsfall parish
Misterhult parish
Gamleby parish
Odensvi parish
Lofta parish
Överum parish
Dalhem parish
Västra Ed parish
Ukna parish
Loftahammar parish
Deanery of Sevede and Aspeland
Vimmerby parish
Tuna parish
Rumskulla parish
Pelarne parish
Frödinge parish
Locknevi parish
Södra Vi-Djursdala parish
Hultsfred parish
Vena parish
Lönneberga parish
Mörlunda-Tveta parish
Virserum parish
Järeda parish
Målilla with Gårdveda parish
Deanery of Vedbo and Ydre
Aneby parish
Askeryd parish
Frinnaryd parish
Lommaryd parish
Haurida-Vireda parish
Säby parish
Linderå parish
Adelöv parish
Norra Ydre parish
Sund-Svinhult parish
Västra Ryd parish
Eksjö parish
Höreda parish
Mellby parish
Hult parish
Edshult parish
Norra Solberga-Flisby parish
Hässleby-Kråkshult parish
Ingatorp-Bellö parish
Deanery of Stångå
Vreta kloster parish
Kärna parish
Kaga parish
Ledberg parish
Skeda parish
Slaka parish
Åkerbo parish
Nykil-Gammalkil parish
Ulrika parish
Vikingstad parish
Vist parish
Vårdnä parish
Rimforsa parish
Kisa parish
Västra Eneby parish
Tidersrum parish
Horn parish
Hycklinge parish

Diocese of Skara 

Deanery of Skara-Barne
Skara cathedral parish
Ardala parish
Varnhem parish
Eggby-Öglunda parish
Axvall parish
Vara parish
Levene parish
Ryda parish
Larv parish
Vedum parish
Kvänum parish
Essunga parish
Lekåsa-Barne Åsaka parish
Främmestad-Bäreberg parish
Tengene parish
Trökörna parish
Fridhem parish
Särestad parish
Flo parish
Deanery of Väne
Vänersborg and Väne-Ryr parish
Västra Tunhem parish
Gärdhem parish
Åsaka-Björke parish
Vänersnä parish
Trollhättan parish
Lextorp parish
Götalunden parish
Fors-Rommele parish
Upphärad parish
Deanery of Falköping
Falköping parish
Mösseberg parish
Slöta-Karleby parish
Åslebygden parish
Yllestad parish
Stenstorp parish
Hornborga parish
Dala-Borgunda-Högstena parish
Gudhem parish
Floby parish
Kinneved parish
Åsarp parish
Deanery of Hökensås
Mullsjö-Sandhem parish
Habo parish
Gustav Adolf parish
Brandstorp parish
Tidaholm parish
Hökensås parish
Fröjered parish
Valstad parish
Varv parish
Deanery of Kålland-Kinne
Lidköping parish
Sunnersberg parish
Örslösa parish
Kållands-Råda parish
Sävare parish
Järpå parish
Götene parish
Kinnekulle parish
Källby parish
Husaby parish
Kleva-Sil parish
Ledsjö parish
Deanery of Kåkind
Hjo parish
Mofalla parish
Fågelå parish
Korsberga-Fridene parish
Tibro parish
Ransberg parish
Karlsborg parish
Mölltorp parish
Brevik parish
Undenä parish
Deanery of Vadsbo
Amnehärad parish
Lyrestad parish
Finnerödja-Tived parish
Töreboda parish
Fredsberg-Bäck parish
Fägre parish
Hova-Älgarå parish
Mariestad parish
Ullervad parish
Lugnå parish
Deanery of Billing
Skövde parish
Ryd parish
Våmb parish
Skultorp parish
Värsås-Varola-Vreten parish
Sventorp-Forsby parish
Väring parish
Frösve parish
Berg parish
Götlunda parish
Deanery of Redväg
Norra Mo parish
Ulricehamn parish
Timmele parish
Hössna parish
Norra Hestra parish
Redväg parish
Södra Ving parish
Hällstad parish
Åsunden parish
Deanery of Ås
Borås Caroli parish
Borås Gustav Adolf parish
Brämhult parish
Fristad parish
Toarp parish
Rångedala parish
Äspered parish
Sandhult parish
Bredared parish
Deanery of Kulling
Alingså parish
Ödenä parish
Hemsjö parish
Algutstorp parish
Lena parish
Hol parish
Nårunga parish
Asklanda parish
Bjärke parish
Herrljunga parish
Herrljunga landsbygdsparish
Hov parish
Östra Gäsene parish
Hudene parish

Diocese of Strängnäs 

Cathedral deanery
Strängnäs cathedral parish with Aspö
Mariefred parish
Vårfruberga-Härad parish
Stallarholmen parish
Åker-Länna parish
Daga parish
Frustuna parish
Deanery of Oppunda and Villåttinge
Katrineholmsbygden parish
Västra Vingåker parish
Österåker parish
Björkvik parish
Flen, Helgesta-Hyltinge parish
Dunker-Lilla Malma parish
Mellösa parish
Bettna parish
Deanery of Nyköping
Kiladalen parish
Nyköping Saint Nicolai parish
Nyköping Alla Helgona parish
Oxelösund parish
Stigtomta-Vrena parish
Tunaberg parish
Rönö parish
Tystbergabygden parish
Deanery of Södertälje
Enhörna parish
Hölö-Mörkö parish
Södertälje parish
Turinge-Taxinge parish
Överjärna parish
Ytterjärna parish
Vårdinge parish
Östertälje parish
Trosa parish
Deanery of Rekarne
Eskilstuna parish
Torshälla parish
Hällby parish with Tumbo and Råby-Rekarne
Västra Rekarne parish
Husby-Rekarne parish
Näshulta parish
Kafjärden parish
Stenkvista-Ärla parish
Deanery of Örebro
Almby parish
Längbro parish
Örebro Nikolai parish
Örebro Olaus Petri parish
Adolfsberg parish
Mosjö-Täby parish
Mikael parish
Deanery of Glanshammar and Edsberg
Axberg parish
Glanshammar parish
Tysslinge parish
Edsberg parish
Knista parish
Ramundeboda parish
Skagershult parish
Viby parish
Deanery of Kumla and Asker
Askersund parish
Hallsberg parish
Hammar parish
Kumla parish
Hardemo parish
Ekeby parish
Lerbäck parish
Snavlunda parish
Asker parish
Lännä parish
Sköllersta parish
Stora Mellösa parish
Gällersta-Norrbyå parish
Deanery of Nynäs
Grödinge parish
Nynäshamn parish
Salem parish
Sorunda parish
Ösmo-Torö parish

Diocese of Västerås 

Cathedral deanery
Västerås cathedral parish
Västerås Lundby parish
Västerås Badelunda parish
Skerike-Gideonsberg parish
Dingtuna-Lillhärad parish
Västerås-Barkarö parish
Rytterne parish
Kungsåra parish
Norrbo parish
Tillberga parish
Önsta parish
Deanery of Southern Västmanland
Köpingsbygden parish
Malma parish
Arbogabygden parish
Kungsör parish
Hallstahammar-Berg parish
Kolbäck-Säby parish
Ramnä parish
Sura parish
Deanery of Bergslagen
Fellingsbro parish
Linde bergslag parish
Guldsmedshyttan parish
Näsby parish
Nora bergslagsparish
Ljusnarsberg parish
Grythyttan parish
Hällefors-Hjulsjö parish
Deanery of Västerbergslagen
Norrbärke parish
Söderbärke parish
Gränge-Säfsnä parish
Ludvika parish
Järna with Nås and Äppelbo parish
Deanery of Northern Dalarna
Mora parish
Älvdalen parish
Idre-Särna parish
Orsa parish
Malung parish
Lima-Transtrand parish
Deanery of Tuna
Stora Tuna parish
Torsång parish
Säterbygden parish
Hedemora-Garpenberg parish
Husby parish
Folkärna parish
By parish
Grytnä parish
Avesta parish
Deanery of Falu-Nedansiljan
Falu Kristine parish
Stora Kopparberg parish
Aspeboda parish
Grycksbo parish
Vika-Hosjö parish
Svärdsjö parish
Enviken parish
Sundborn parish
Bjurså parish
Leksand parish
Djura parish
Siljansnä parish
Gagnef parish
Mockfjärd parish
Floda parish
Ål parish
Rättvik parish
Boda parish
Ore parish
Deanery of Northern Västmanland
Norberg-Karbenning parish
Västanfors-Västervåla parish
Skinnskatteberg with Hed and Gunnilbo parish
Sala parish, Sweden
Norrby parish
Möklinta parish
Kumla parish
Tärna parish
Kila parish
Västerfärnebo-Fläckebo parish

Diocese of Växjö 

Deanery of Eastern Värend
Växjö cathedral parish
Hemmesjö with Tegnaby parish
Furuby parish
Skogslyckan parish
Öjaby parish
Ör-Ormesberga parish
Bergunda parish
Öja parish
Lammhults parish
Teleborg parish
Vederslöv-Dänningelanda parish
Kalvsvik parish
Tävelså parish
Växjö Maria parish
Tingså parish
Väckelsång parish
Södra Sandsjö parish
Linneryd parish
Älmeboda parish
Urshult parish
Almundsryd parish
Hovmantorp parish
Ljuder parish
Lessebo parish
Ekeberga parish
Östra Torså parish
Nöbbele parish
Uråsa parish
Jät parish
Åseda parish
Nottebäck parish
Älghult parish
Lenhovda-Herråkra parish
Sjöså parish
Dädesjö parish
Söraby, Tolg and Tjureda parish
Gårdsby parish
Deanery of Allbo-Sunnerbo
Göteryd parish
Pjätteryd parish
Hallaryd parish
Traryd parish
Hinneryd parish
Markaryd parish
Berga parish
Vittaryd parish
Dörarp parish
Bolmsö parish
Tannåker parish
Ryssby parish
Tutaryd parish
Agunnaryd parish
Södra Ljunga parish
Ljungby parish
Lidhult parish
Odensjö parish
Vrå parish
Annerstad parish
Torpa parish
Ljungby Maria parish
Angelstad parish
Skatelöv parish
Västra Torså parish
Virestad parish
Härlunda parish
Moheda parish
Slätthög parish
Mistelå parish
Alvesta parish
Vislanda parish
Blädinge parish
Stenbrohult parish
Älmhult parish
Deanery of Tveta
Jönköpings Kristina-Ljungarum parish
Jönköpings Sofia-Järstorp parish
Rogberga-Öggestorp parish
Bankeryd parish
Norrahammar parish
Månsarp parish
Barnarp parish
Ödestugu parish
Deanery of Vista
Gränna parish
Visingsö parish
Skärstad-Ölmstad parish
Lekeryd parish
Huskvarna parish
Hakarp parish
Deanery of Östbo-Västbo
Forshedabygden parish
Gislaved parish
Våthult parish
Bosebo parish
Reftele parish
Å parish
Kållerstad parish
Anderstorp parish
Kävsjö parish
Åsenhöga parish
Källeryd parish
Gnosjö parish
Bredaryd parish
Kulltorp parish
Långaryd parish
Unnaryd parish
Färgaryd parish
Femsjö parish
Burseryd parish
Södra Hestra parish
Gryteryd parish
Villstad parish
Rydaholm parish
Voxtorp parish
Gällaryd parish
Tånnö parish
Värnamo parish
Nydala-Fryele parish
Tofteryd parish
Åker parish
Hagshult parish
Byarum-Bondstorp parish
Svenarum parish
Deanery of Njudung
Alseda parish
Vetlanda parish
Näsby parish
Björkö parish
Nävelsjö parish
Lannaskede parish
Bäckseda parish
Korsberga parish
Nye, Näshult and Stenberga parish
Norra Sandsjö parish
Bringetofta parish
Malmbäck parish
Almesåkra parish
Sävsjö parish
Vrigstad-Hylletofta parish
Stockaryd parish
Hultsjö parish
Hjälmseryd parish
Nässjö parish
Barkeryd-Forserum parish
Deanery of Kalmar-Öland
Kalmar cathedral parish
Kalmar Saint John parish
Heliga Korset parish
Saint Birgitta parish
Två systrar parish
Dörby parish
Hossmo parish
Ryssby parish
Åby parish
Förlösa-Kläckeberga parish
Ljungby parish
Arby-Hagby parish
Halltorp-Voxtorp parish
Karlslunda-Mortorp parish
Torslunda parish
Glömminge parish
Algutsrum parish
Norra Möckleby, Sandby and Gårdby parish
Mörbylånga-Kastlösa parish
Resmo-Vickleby parish
Hulterstad-Stenåsa parish
Sydöland parish
Nordöland parish
Köpingsvik parish
Föra-Alböke-Löt parish
Borgholm parish
Gärdslösa, Långlöt and Runsten parish
Räpplinge-Högsrum parish
Deanery of Stranda-Möre
Ålem parish
Mönsterå parish
Fliseryd parish
Döderhult parish
Oskarshamn parish
Högsby parish
Fågelfors parish
Långemåla parish
Fagerhult parish
Söderåkra parish
Torså parish
Gullabo parish
Emmaboda parish
Långasjö parish
Vissefjärda parish
Algutsboda parish
Nybro-Saint Sigfrid parish
Madesjö parish
Örsjö parish
Oskar parish
Hälleberga parish
Bäckebo parish
Kråksmåla parish
Kristvalla parish

Diocese of Lund 

Deanery of Torna
Lund cathedral parish
Lund Allhelgona parish
Saint Peters cloister parish
Dalby parish
Södra Sandby parish
Torn parish
Veberöd parish
Genarp parish
Helgeand parish
Eastern Lund city parish
Norra Nöbbelöv parish
Deanery of Skytt
Vellinge-Månstorp parish
Trelleborg parish
Höllviken parish
Dalköpinge parish
Hammarlöv parish
Källstorp parish
Anderslöv parish
Skanör-Falsterbo parish
Deanery of Bara
Svedala parish
Värby parish
Burlöv parish
Uppåkra parish
Saint Staffan parish
Lomma parish
Bjärred parish
Deanery of Vemmenhög, Ljunit, Herrestad and Fär
Skurup parish
Villie parish
Skivarp parish
Ljunit parish
Ystad parish
Sövestadsbygden parish
Stora Köpinge parish
Löderup parish
Blentarp parish
Lövestad parish
Sjöbo parish
Vollsjö parish
Deanery of Frosta
Västerstad parish
Hörby parish
Löberöd parish
Höör parish
Ringsjö parish
Reslöv-Östra Karaby parish
Östra Onsjö parish
Eslöv parish
Deanery of Rönneberg
Landskrona parish
Svalövsbygden parish
Billeberga-Sireköpinge parish
Häljarp parish
Löddebygden parish
Kågeröd-Röstånga parish
Lackalänga-Stävie parish
Västra Karaby parish
Dagstorp parish
Hofterup parish
Teckomatorp parish
Kävlinge parish
Deanery of Luggude
Allerum parish
Fleninge parish
Välinge-Kattarp parish
Väsby parish
Viken parish
Höganä parish
Brunnby parish
Farhult-Jonstorp parish
Kropp parish
Bjuv parish
Ekeby parish
Deanery of Helsingborg
Helsingborg Maria parish
Helsingborg Gustav Adolf parish
Rau parish
Kvistofta parish
Filborna parish
Deanery of Österlen
Kivik parish
Borrby-Östra Hoby parish
Hammenhög parish
Stiby parish
Simrishamn parish
Saint Olof parish
Rörum parish
Smedstorp parish
Tomelillabygden parish
Brösarp-Tranå parish
Deanery of Åsbo
Björnekulla-Västra Broby parish
Kvidinge parish
Östra Ljungby parish
Klippan parish
Riseberga-Färingtofta parish
Perstorp parish
Örkelljunga parish
Rya parish
Skånes-Fagerhult parish
Deanery of Bjäre
Västra Karup-Hov parish
Torekov parish
Förslöv-Grevie parish
Barkåkra parish
Hjärnarp-Tåstarp parish
Båstad-Östra Karup parish
Munka Ljungby parish
Ängelholm parish
Strövelstorp parish
Deanery of Västra Göinge
Vinslöv parish
Sösdala parish
Tyringe parish
Röke parish
Västra Torup parish
Norra Åkarp parish
Vankiva parish
Vittsjö parish
Verum parish
Stoby parish
Hässleholm parish
Hästveda parish
Farstorp parish
Deanery of Östra Göinge
Östra Broby parish
Emmislöv parish
Glimåkra parish
Örkened parish
Osby-Visseltofta parish
Loshult parish
Hjärså parish
Knislinge-Gryt parish
Kviinge parish
Deanery of Villand and Gärd
Kristianstads Heliga Trefaldighet parish
Norra Åsum parish
Ivetofta-Gualöv parish
Åhus parish
Nosaby parish
Oppmanna parish
Vånga parish
Fjälkinge-Nymö parish
Gustav Adolf-Rinkaby parish
Bäckaskog parish
Näsum parish
Västra and Östra Vram parish
Linderöd parish
Äsphult parish
Everödsbygden parish
Degeberga parish
Vä-Skepparslöv parish
Träne-Djurröd parish
Köpinge parish
Araslöv parish
Deanery of Karlskrona-Ronneby
Karlskrona admiralty parish
Karlskrona city parish
Aspö parish
Jämjö parish
Ramdala parish
Sturkö parish
Kristianopel parish
Torhamn parish
Lyckå parish
Nättraby-Hasslö parish
Fridlevstad parish
Rödeby parish
Ronneby parish
Bräkne-Hoby parish
Deanery of Lister and Bräkne
Karlshamn parish
Asarum parish
Ringamåla parish
Hällaryd parish
Åryd parish
Mörrum-Elleholm parish
Mjällby parish
Gammalstorp-Ysane parish
Jämshög parish
Kyrkhult parish
Sölvesborg parish
Deanery of Southern Malmö
Slottsstaden parish
Limhamn parish
Hyllie parish
Bunkeflo parish
Kulladal parish
Tygelsjö-Västra Klagstorp parish
Fosie parish
Oxie parish
Deanery of Northern Malmö
Malmö Saint Peter parish
Malmö Saint Paul parish
Malmö Saint John parish
Möllevången-Sofielund parish
Eriksfält parish
Västra Skrävlinge parish
Kirseberg parish
Husie and Södra Sallerup parish

Diocese of Gothenburg 

Cathedral deanery
Gothenburg cathedral parish
German Christinae parish
Gothenburg Vasa parish
Gothenburg Johanneberg parish
Gothenburg Haga parish
Gothenburg Annedal parish
Gothenburg Masthugg parish
Gothenburg Oscar Fredrik parish
Deanery of Älvsborg
Gothenburg Carl Johan parish
Västra Frölunda parish
Högsbo parish
Älvsborg parish
Tynnered parish
Askim parish
Styrsö parish
Näset parish
Deanery of Nylöse
Gothenburg Saint Paul parish
Nylöse parish
Bergsjön parish
Kortedala parish
Härlanda parish
Örgryte parish
Angered parish
Bergum parish
Gunnared parish
Björkekärr parish
Deanery of Hising
Lundby parish
Backa parish
Tuve-Säve parish
Öckerö parish
Torslanda-Björlanda parish
Deanery of Göta Älvdalen
Kungälv parish
Ytterby parish
Romelanda parish
Kareby parish
Torsby parish
Harestad parish
Lycke parish
Marstrand parish
Solberga parish
Jörlanda parish
Hålta parish
Fuxerna-Åsbräcka parish
Hjärtum parish
Västerlanda parish
Starrkärr-Kilanda parish
Nödinge parish
Skepplanda-Hålanda parish
Lödöse parish
Deanery of Uddevalla
Ljungskile parish
Uddevalla parish
Lane-Ryr parish
Herrestad parish
Bäve parish
Bokenäset parish
Deanery of Stenungsund
Stenkyrka parish
Klövedal parish
Valla parish
Rönnäng parish
Morlanda parish
Tegneby parish
Röra parish
Stala parish
Myckleby parish
Långelanda parish
Torp parish
Spekeröd-Ucklum parish
Norum parish
Ödsmål parish
Deanery of Northern Bohuslän
Fo parish
Sörbygden parish
Svarteborg-Bärfendal parish
Bro parish
Brastad parish
Lysekil parish
Lyse parish
Skaftö parish
Tossene parish
Hunnebostrand parish
Södra Sotenä parish
Kville parish
Fjällbacka parish
Bottna parish
Svenneby parish
Tanum parish
Lur parish
Naverstad-Mo parish
Strömstad parish
Skee-Tjärnö parish
Idefjorden parish
Deanery of Partille and Lerum
Stora Lundby parish
Östad parish
Skallsjö parish
Lerum parish
Partille parish
Sävedalen parish
Deanery of Mark and Bollebygd
Sätila parish
Hyssna parish
Fritsla-Skephult parish
Kinnarumma parish
Seglora parish
Örby-Skene parish
Kinna parish
Västra Mark parish
Istorp parish
Öxnevalla parish
Horred parish
Torestorp parish
Öxabäck parish
Älekulla parish
Bollebygd parish
Töllsjö parish
Björketorp parish
Deanery of Kind
Mjöbäck parish
Holsljunga parish
Svenljungabygden parish
Sexdrega parish
Länghem parish
Dannike parish
Månstad parish
Södra Åsarp parish
Dalstorp parish
Tranemo parish
Mossebo parish
Ambjörnarp parish
Sjötofta parish
Kindaholm parish
Deanery of Kungsbacka
Tölö parish
Älvsåker parish
Vallda parish
Släp parish
Onsala parish
Kungsbacka-Hanhal parish
Fjärås-Förlanda parish
Frilleså parish
Gällinge parish
Idala parish
Ölmevalla parish
Landa parish
Deanery of Varberg
Varberg parish
Lindberga parish
Träslöv parish
Himledalen parish
Tvååker parish
Spannarp parish
Sibbarp-Dagså parish
Värö parish
Stråvalla parish
Veddige-Kungsäter parish
Deanery of Falkenberg
Morup parish
Falkenberg parish
Skrea parish
Vinberg-Ljungby parish
Fagered parish
Källsjö parish
Ullared parish
Älvsered parish
Gunnarp parish
Gällared parish
Krogsered parish
Vessige parish
Okome parish
Susedalen parish
Torup parish
Kinnared parish
Drängsered parish
Stafsinge parish
Deanery of Halmstad and Laholm
Getinge-Rävinge parish
Harplinge parish
Steninge parish
Söndrum-Vapnö parish
Saint Nikolai parish
Martin Luther parish
Snöstorp parish
Slättåkra-Kvibille parish
Enslöv parish
Oskarström parish
Laholm parish
Skummeslöv parish
Veinge-Tjärby parish
Knäred parish
Hishult parish
Ränneslöv-Ysby parish
Hasslöv-Våxtorp parish
Deanery of Mölndal
Fässberg parish
Råda parish
Landvetter parish
Härryda parish
Kållered parish
Stensjön parish
Lindome parish

Diocese of Karlstad 

Cathedral deanery
Karlstad cathedral parish
Norrstrand parish
Stora Kil parish
Frykerud parish
Boda parish
Grava parish
Forshaga-Munkfors parish
Hammarö parish
Väse-Fågelvik parish
Västerstrand parish
Alster-Nyedsbygden parish
Deanery of Eastern Värmland
Karlskoga parish
Degerfors-Nysund parish
Kristinehamn parish
Ölme parish
Visnum parish
Visnums-Kil parish
Rudskoga parish
Filipstad parish
Storfors parish
Deanery of Fryksdal and Älvdal
Sunne parish
Östra Ämtervik parish
Västra Ämtervik parish
Gräsmark parish
Fryksände parish
Lekvattnet parish
Östmark parish
Vitsand parish
Lysvik parish
Ekshärad parish
Norra Råda-Sunnemo parish
Hagfors-Gustav Adolf parish
Övre Älvdal parish
Deanery of Jösse
Arvika Västra parish
Arvika Östra parish
Älgå parish
Ny parish
Gunnarskog parish
Köla parish
Järnskog-Skillingmark parish
Eda parish
Brunskog parish
Mangskog parish
Stavnäs-Högerud parish
Glava parish
Deanery of Nordmark
Holmedal-Karlanda parish
Töcksmark parish
Östervallskog parish
Västra Fågelvik parish
Silbodal parish
Blomskog parish
Trankil parish
Sillerud parish
Deanery of Nor
Nor-Segerstad parish
Grum parish
Värmskog parish
Ed-Borgvik parish
Säffle parish
Tveta parish
Södra Värmlandsnä parish
Gillberga parish
Kila parish
Svanskog parish
Långserud parish
Bro parish
Ny-Huggenä parish
Deanery of Northern Dals
Steneby-Tisselskog parish
Bäcke-Ödskölt parish
Ärtemark parish
Laxarby-Vårvik parish
Torrskog parish
Åmål parish
Dals-Ed parish
Deanery of Southern Dals
Holm parish
Skållerud parish
Ör parish
Bolstad parish
Frändefors parish
Brålanda parish
Sundals-Ryr parish
Gestad parish
Högsäter parish
Rännelanda-Lerdal parish
Järbo-Råggärd parish
Färgelanda parish

Diocese of Härnösand 

Deanery of Härnösand-Kramfors
Härnösand cathedral parish
Säbrå parish
Häggdånger parish
Hemsö parish
Stigsjö parish
Viksjö parish
Högsjö parish
Nordingrå parish
Ullånger parish
Vibyggerå parish
Nora-Skog parish
Gudmundrå parish
Ytterlännäs parish
Torsåker parish
Dal parish
Bjärtrå parish
Styrnä parish
Deanery of Sollefteå
Sollefteå parish
Multrå-Sånga parish
Boteå parish
Överlännä parish
Långsele parish
Graninge parish
Helgum parish
Ramsele-Edsele parish
Ådals-Liden parish
Junsele parish
Resele parish
Ed parish
Deanery of Örnsköldsvik
Själevad parish
Mo parish
Björna parish
Örnsköldsvik parish
Arnä parish
Gideå parish
Trehörningsjö parish
Grundsunda parish
Nätra parish
Sidensjö parish
Anundsjö parish
Skorped parish
Deanery of Medelpad
Skön parish
Alnö parish
Timrå parish
Sundsvall Gustav Adolf parish
Skönsmon parish
Njurunda parish
Selånger parish
Hässjö parish
Tynderö parish
Ljustorp parish
Indal parish
Sättna parish
Liden parish
Holm parish
Torp parish
Borgsjö-Haverö parish
Stöde parish
Tuna parish
Attmar parish
Deanery of Östersund
Brunflo parish
Marieby parish
Lockne parish
Näs parish
Östersund parish
Frösö parish
Sunne parish
Norderö parish
Häggenås-Lit-Kyrkå parish
Deanery of Bräcke-Ragunda
Ragunda parish
Fors parish
Borgvattnet parish
Hällesjö-Håsjö parish
Stugun parish
Revsund, Sundsjö, Bodsjö parish
Bräcke-Nyhem parish
Deanery of Krokom-Åre-Strömsund
Undersåker parish
Kall parish
Västra Storsjöbygden parish
Åre parish
Föllingebygden parish
Rödön parish
Näskott parish
Aspå parish
Å parish
Offerdal parish
Alsen parish
Ström-Alanä parish
Bodum parish
Fjällsjö parish
Gåxsjö parish
Hammerdal parish
Tåsjö parish
Frostviken parish
Deanery of Berg-Härjedalen
Svegsbygden parish
Hedebygden parish
Tännäs-Ljusnedal parish
Ytterhogdal, Överhogdal and Ängersjö parish
Berg parish
Hackå parish
Oviken-Myssjö parish
Rätan-Klövsjö parish
Åsarne parish

Diocese of Luleå 

Deanery of Southern Västerbotten
Nordmaling parish
Bjurholm parish
Hörnefors parish
Vindeln parish
Sävar-Holmön parish
Vännä parish
Holmsund parish
Bygdeå parish
Deanery of Umeå
Umeå landsparish
Tavelsjö parish
Umeå city parish
Ålidhem parish
Teg parish
Umeå Maria parish
Deanery of Skellefteå
Skellefteå landsparish
Norsjö parish
Byske-Fällfors parish
Skellefteå Saint Olov parish
Skellefteå Saint Örjan parish
Kågedalen parish
Jörn-Boliden parish
Lövånger parish
Burträsk parish
Bureå parish
Deanery of Piteå
Piteå parish
Älvsby parish
Norrfjärden parish
Hortlax parish
Arvidsjaur parish
Arjeplog parish
Deanery of Luleå
Nederluleå parish
Överluleå parish
Sävast parish
Gunnarsbyn parish
Edefors parish
Luleå cathedral parish
Råneå parish
Deanery of Kalix-Torneå
Nederkalix parish
Överkalix parish
Töre parish
Haparanda parish
Övertorneå parish
Pajala parish
Deanery of Southern Lappland
Lycksele parish
Dorotea-Risbäck parish
Sorsele parish
Stensele parish
Vilhelmina parish
Tärna parish
Malå parish
Åsele-Fredrika parish
Deanery of Northern Lappland
Jukkasjärvi parish
Vittangi parish
Karesuando parish
Gällivare parish
Malmberget parish
Jokkmokk parish

Diocese of Visby 

Deanery of Nordertredingen
Visby cathedral parish
Väskinde parish
Stenkyrka parish
Bunge, Rute and Fleringe parish
Fårö parish
Forsa parish
Othem-Boge parish
Dalhem parish
Gothem parish
Deanery of Medeltredingen
Eskelhem-Tofta parish
Vall, Hogrän and Atlingbo parish
Stenkumla parish
Roma parish
Björke parish
Follingbo parish
Akebäck parish
Barlingbo parish
Endre parish
Hejdeby parish
Östergarn parish
Vänge parish
Klinte parish
Fröjel parish
Eksta parish
Sproge parish
Sanda, Västergarn and Mästerby parish
Hejde parish
Väte parish
Deanery of Sudertredingen
Fardhem parish
Linde parish
Lojsta parish
Levide parish
Gerum parish
Garde parish
Stånga-Bur parish
När-Lau parish
Alva, Hemse and Rone parish
Havdhem parish
Hoburg parish

Diocese of Stockholm together with the Royal consistory 

Cathedral deanery
Stockholm cathedral parish
Kungsholmen parish
Saint George parish
Adolf Fredrik parish
German Saint Gertrud parish
Finnish parish
Essinge parish
Saint John parish
Gustaf Vasa parish
Saint Matthew parish
Deanery of Södermalm
Maria Magdalena parish
Högalid parish
Katarina Parish
Sofia parish
Deanery of Brännkyrka
Hägersten parish
Skärholmen parish
Brännkyrka parish
Deanery of Birka
Färingsö parish
Ekerö parish
Adelsö-Munsö parish
Lovö parish
Bromma Parish
Västerled parish
Deanery of Roslags
Täby parish
Österåker-Östra Ryd parish
Vaxholm parish
Ljusterö-Kulla parish
Vallentuna parish
Össeby parish
Deanery of Värmdö
Värmdö parish
Djurö, Möja and Nämdö parish
Gustavsberg-Ingarö parish
Boo parish
Nacka parish
Saltsjöbaden parish
Deanery of Södertörn
Tyresö parish
Dalarö-Ornö-Utö parish
Västerhaninge-Muskö parish
Österhaninge parish
Royal consistory
Royal parish
Deanery of Östermalm
Hedvig Eleonora Parish
Oscar Parish
Engelbrekt Parish
Deanery of Enskede
Enskede-Årsta parish
Vantör parish
Skarpnäck parish
Farsta parish
Deanery of Spånga
Spånga-Kista parish
Hässelby parish
Vällingby parish
Deanery of Sollentuna
Sollentuna parish
Ed parish
Hammarby parish
Fresta parish
Järfälla parish
Deanery of Solna
Solna parish
Danderyd parish
Sundbyberg parish
Lidingö parish
Deanery of Huddinge-Botkyrka
Huddinge parish
Botkyrka parish
Trångsund-Skogå parish
Saint Michael parish
Flemingsberg parish

See also 
 List of municipalities of Sweden

References

Web sources

External links 
 Svenska kyrkans officiella webbplats
 Kyrksajten.se - Förteckning över Sveriges samtliga parishar
 Statistiska centralbyrån - Kyrkliga indelningar

 
Sweden geography-related lists
Sweden, Dioceses, deaneries and parishes

Sweden